Drag Race España (sometimes called Drag Race Spain) is a Spanish reality competition streaming television series, produced by Atresmedia Televisión in collaboration with Buendía Estudios and executive produced by World of Wonder. It is the Spanish adaptation of the Drag Race franchise. In a similar format to the American version, the show features a crop of Spanish drag queens as they compete for a grand prize of €30,000 and the title of "Spain's Next Drag Superstar". The series is airing on ATRESplayer Premium in Spain and on WOW Presents Plus elsewhere. The first season premiered on 30 May, and concluded on 25 July 2021.

The winner of the first season of Drag Race España was Carmen Farala. The winner of the second season of Drag Race España was Sharonne.

The series was renewed for a second season, which premiered on March 27, 2022.

Later on, the series was renewed for a third season set to air in 2023, and an All Stars version was announced.

Production 
The program is produced by World of Wonder and Atresmedia in collaboration with Buendía Estudios. It premiered in May 2021 through the Atresplayer Premium payment platform, while internationally it is broadcast via streaming on WOW Presents Plus. On December 30, 2020, the opening of the selection process for the participants was announced. The main judges: Ana Locking, Javier Ambrossi and Javier Calvo and the main presenter Supremme de Luxe were announced in March 2021, while the ten contestants were announced on April 26, 2021. Two days later, Michelle Visage made the official presentation of the contestants and announced that the program would premiere in May of that same year.

Casting occurred in early 2021 with filming starting by early March 2021. In Spain, the show is carried by ATRESplayer Premium. In the United States, the United Kingdom, and other international territories, the series premiered on WOW Presents Plus, the streaming service of RuPaul's Drag Race production company World of Wonder, concurrently with its Spanish debut. It is the seventh international version of the Drag Race franchise, after The Switch Drag Race, Drag Race Thailand, RuPaul's Drag Race UK, Canada's Drag Race, Drag Race Holland and RuPaul's Drag Race Down Under. On August 31, 2021, it was announced that Atresmedia renewed the series for a second season.

Judging panel
On 15 February 2021, it was confirmed that the show would be hosted by Spanish drag queen Supremme de Luxe. On 1 March 2021, it was announced that the judges panel would include fashion designer Ana Locking, and film and television actors, directors and writers Javier Ambrossi and Javier Calvo.

Contestants 

There have been a total of 22 contestants featured on Drag Race España.

Series overview

Season 1 (2021) 

The first season of Drag Race España began airing on 30 May 2021 on ATRESplayer Premium in Spain and World of Wonder's streaming service WOW Presents Plus internationally. The season ran for 9 episodes and concluded on 25 July 2021. Carmen Farala, Killer Queen, and Sagittaria made the final, and Carmen Farala was the winner of the first season.

Season 2 (2022) 

On 31 August 2021, it was announced that Atresmedia renewed the series for a second season. A trailer for the second season was posted via social media on 13 January 2022. It premiered on 27 March 2022. The season ran for 11 episodes and concluded on 5 June 2022. Estrella Xtravaganza, Marina, Sharonne, and Venedita Von Däsh made the final, with Sharonne winning the title of Spain’s Next Drag Superstar.

Season 3 (TBD)
Production of a third season has been announced, with casting opening in September 2022.

Spin-off
In September 2022, Atresmedia announced that Drag Race España: All Stars is in production. The series, which will be the first international version of the RuPaul's Drag Race All Stars format, is scheduled to air following season 3.

References

External links
 

2020s LGBT-related reality television series
2021 in LGBT history
2021 Spanish television series debuts
Atresplayer Premium original programming
 
Spanish LGBT-related television shows
Spanish reality television series
Spanish television series based on American television series
Television series by Buendía Estudios
WOW Presents Plus original programming